Lavelle Westbrooks (born January 12, 1992) is an American football cornerback for the Montreal Alouettes of the Canadian Football League (CFL). He was drafted by the Cincinnati Bengals in the seventh round of the 2014 NFL Draft. He played college football at Georgia Southern.

On October 6, 2015, Westbrooks was assigned to the San Jose SaberCats.

External links
Georgia Southern Eagles bio

1992 births
Living people
People from Riverdale, Georgia
Sportspeople from the Atlanta metropolitan area
Players of American football from Georgia (U.S. state)
American football cornerbacks
Georgia Southern Eagles football players
Cincinnati Bengals players
Buffalo Bills players
San Jose SaberCats players
American players of Canadian football
Canadian football defensive backs
Montreal Alouettes players